The 2020–21 season was Çaykur Rizespor's 68th season in existence and the club's third consecutive season in the top flight of Turkish football. In addition to the domestic league, Çaykur Rizespor participated in this season's editions of the Turkish Cup. The season covers the period from July 2020 to 30 June 2021.

Players

Current squad

Out on loan

Transfers

In

Out

Pre-season and friendlies

Competitions

Overview

Süper Lig

League table

Results summary

Results by round

Matches

Turkish Cup

Statistics

Goalscorers

Last updated: 15 May 2021

Clean sheets

Last updated: 15 May 2021

References

External links

Çaykur Rizespor seasons
Çaykur Rizespor